Agung Setyabudi (born 2 November 1972 in Solo, Central Java) is an Indonesian former footballer, he normally played as a defender and is  tall. He is former player for the Indonesia national football team, playing in the Olympic Games qualifiers, Tiger Cup and Asian Cup.

He previously played for PSIS Semarang.

International career

International goals

Honours

Club
PSIS Semarang
 Liga Indonesia Premier Division: 1998–99
 Liga Indonesia First Division: 2001

International
 AFF Championship runner-up: 2002

References

External links

1972 births
Living people
Indonesian footballers
arseto F.C. players
PSIS Semarang players
persis Solo players
persebaya Surabaya players
1996 AFC Asian Cup players
Indonesia international footballers
Southeast Asian Games bronze medalists for Indonesia
Southeast Asian Games medalists in football
Association football defenders
Competitors at the 1999 Southeast Asian Games
Sportspeople from Central Java